Rossano is a town and frazione of Corigliano-Rossano in the province of Cosenza, Calabria, southern Italy. The city is situated on an eminence  from the Gulf of Taranto. The town is known for its marble and alabaster quarries.

The town is the seat of a Catholic archbishop and has a notable cathedral and castle. Two popes have been born in the town, along with Nilus the Younger.

History

Roscianum was the original name of the town under the Roman Empire. In the second century AD, emperor Hadrian built or rebuilt a port here, which could accommodate up to 300 ships. It was mentioned in the Antonine itineraries, as one of the important fortresses of Calabria. The Goths of Alaric I and, in the following century, Totila, were unable to take it.

The Rossanesi showed great attachment to the Byzantine Empire, whose local strategos had his seat here. The Rossano Gospels, a sixth century illuminated manuscript of great historical and artistic value, is a tangible relic of that period.

The Saracens failed to conquer Rossano, while in 982 Otto II captured it temporarily from the Byzantines. Its Greek character was preserved long after its conquest by the Normans, as noted by its long retention of the Greek Rite over the Latin Rite. The city in fact maintained notable privileges under the subsequent Hohenstaufen and Angevine dominations, but subsequently decayed after the feudalization in 1417. 

Passing to the Sforza, and thus to Sigismund I the Old, it was united in 1558 to the crown of Naples by Philip II of Spain in virtue of a doubtful will by Bona Sforza, queen of Poland in favor of Giovanni Lorenzo Pappacoda. Under Isabella of Naples and Bona, the town had been a centre of literary culture; but under the Spaniards it declined.

In 1612, the crown sold the lordship to the Aldobrandini, and in 1637, it passed to the Borghese who retained it until 1806. The city was part of the Neapolitan Republic of 1799, but its conditions did not improve after the Unification of Italy, and much of the population emigrated.

Rossano was the birthplace of Pope John VII and Antipope John XVI. Rossano was also the birthplace of Bartholomew the Younger and Nilus the Younger, who founded the Abbey of Grottaferrata, and whose "Life" is a valuable source of information about southern Italy in the tenth century.

Main sights
The cathedral (11th century, with massive interventions in the 18th–19th centuries) is the main historical building of Rossano. It has a nave with two aisles, and three apses. The bell tower and the baptismal font are from the 14th century, while the remaining decorations are from the 17th and 18th centuries. The church is famous for the ancient image of the Madonna acheropita ("Madonna not made by hands"), now located in the Diocesan Museum, probably dating between 580 and the first half of the eighth century. In 1879, the famous Codex Rossanensis was discovered in the sacristy. It is a Greek parchment manuscript of Matthew and Mark, written in silver on purple-stained parchment, and is one of the oldest pictorial Gospels known. Scholars date the codex from the end of the fifth to the eighth or ninth century; it is probably of Alexandrian origin.

Chiesa della Panaghia, an example of Byzantine architecture, with traces of frescoes portraying John Chrysostomos.
The Oratory of Saint Mark (10th century, originally dedicated to St. Anastasia) is the most ancient monument of the city and one of the best preserved Byzantine churches in Italy.
The church of Santa Chiara (1546–1554) was built by Bona Sforza.
The church of San Francesco di Paola (late 16th century) has a notable Renaissance portal and a cloister.
The late-Gothic church of San Bernardino (1428–62) was the first Roman Catholic church in Rossano. It houses the sepulchre of Oliverio di Somma (1536) and a seventeenth-century wooden crucifix.
Rossano is also the home of the internationally renowned annual Marco Fiume Blues Passion, a free three-day open air blues/jazz festival named after a native son who was becoming a giant in the American blues/jazz guitar world before his early demise. The festival occurs in July and is linked to the Cognac Blues Festival in France.

Outside the city are:

The Torre Stellata ("Star Tower") is a 16th-century fortification built over an ancient fortress.
The Abbazia del Patire (11th–12th century), an abbey located in a wood outside the city, with some Arab-style mosaics, a Norman apse and ancient portals.

Transportation

Rossano can be reached from the airports of Crotone, Lamezia Terme or Reggio Calabria through SS. 106 Ionica Route. Rossano has a railway station on the secondary branch starting from Sibari, on the line to Crotone.

People 

Nilus the Younger (910 - 27 December 1005 AD), Saint
Bartholomew the Younger (981-1055 AD), Saint
Pope John VII (c. 650 - 18 October 707 AD), Pope
Antipope John XVI (c. 945 - c. 1001), Antipope
Isabela de Rosis (1842 - 1911) religious sister and congregation founder
 (1912-1999), jurist, judge emeritus of the Constitutional Court
Giuseppe Carbone (1923-2013), jurist, emeritus president of the Court of Auditors
Giuseppe Tucci (1940-2018), jurist

References

External links
"Marco Fiume Blues Passion" Memorial Festival  
Rossano Photogallery  

 
Cities and towns in Calabria
Alabaster